Hullshire was a county corporate in the East Riding of Yorkshire, England from 1440 to 1889. Hullshire may refer to the area outside the town of Kingston upon Hull, whilst the entire entity was sometimes referred to as the "Town and County of  Kingston upon Hull".

History
Hull was granted county corporate status in 1440 in the reign of Henry VI. A number of small towns nearby Kingston upon Hull were added to it. The area was self-governing in respect of it having its own courts, with powers of oyer and terminer, to hold assizes on civil and criminal cases. At creation the county corporate had included into it the town and parishes of Hessle (Hassel), North Ferriby, Swanland, West-Ella, Kirk-Ella, Tranby (an area south of Anlaby and north of Hessle), Willardby (Willerby), Anlaby and the priory of Haltemprise. The rights previously given to the town of Hull were extended to the county corporate, with the Mayor acting as the King's Escheator, and with the town Bailiffs replaced by Sheriff and twelve Aldermen, acting as Justices of the Peace, with the Burgesses to answer before the Mayor and Sheriff first, not the King. The Justices of the Peace of the East Riding had no legal authority over the area. At the same time Hull Castle became the responsibility of the town.

In 1515 a skirmish or battle was fought between the Sheriff of Hull and the Prior of Haltemprice Priory over the authority over Willerby (Willarby) and Wolfreton (Woolfreton) – the Prior claimed that though the priory was within Hullshire it was not part of it, and was within the Lordship of Cottingham, and had taken the issue to the Star Chamber; the case was referred to the Abbott of Meaux; Bryan Palmes; and Sir William Constable who had decided in the Prior's favour. Despite this decision on 6 October the Sheriff of Hull together with 200 people of the town began to approach Wolfreton; the Prior, who had been informed of the Sheriff's intentions roused his tenants, and armed the monks of the Priory, who then blocked the roads, and hurled abuse on the Sheriff and his people. The Sheriff's party returned the insults in turn using foul language. Subsequently, the altercation came to blows and a quarrel with arrows ensued. The battle continued until the monks, many being old or fat, gave way, and fled to their priory, followed by the Sheriff's group. The situation was prevented from becoming more inflamed by the arrival of the Lord Mayor of Hull, who having learned of what was happening hastened to the scene with 60 horsemen. Subsequently, the Prior sought redress in the Star Chamber, with the Sheriff accused of riot and other crimes – the legal proceedings continued for three years at much expense, leading to the settlement that the Prior was given Willerby and Newton within his authority, whilst Hull obtained free right to the fresh water springs of Anlaby.

Sculcoates, Drypool, the southern part of Sutton (Sutton-on-Hull), Garrison Side as well as the liberties of Myton and Trippett were added to the parliamentary borough in 1832, and in 1836 the new municipal borough was made to be of the same extent. (see also Municipal Corporations Act 1835). Newington (parishes of Kirk Ella and North Ferriby); Stoneferry; Marfleet and Newland were added in the second half of the 19th century.

The county corporate was abolished in 1889. (See Local Government Act 1888)

Hull became a county borough in 1888, and gained city status in 1897.

See also

Hallamshire
Hexhamshire
Winchcombeshire

References

Sources

History of the East Riding of Yorkshire
1440 establishments in England
1889 disestablishments in England
History of Kingston upon Hull